Justin Suh (born June 12, 1997) is an American professional golfer who plays on the PGA Tour. He was number one in the World Amateur Golf Ranking between October 2018 and April 2019.

Career
Suh represented the United States at the 2018 Eisenhower Trophy where he won the silver medal together with Cole Hammer and Collin Morikawa.

He played college golf at University of Southern California where he was Pac-12 Player of the Year in 2018.

Suh turned professional after graduating with a degree in business administration in 2019. He played briefly on the PGA Tour Latinoamérica before joining the Korn Ferry Tour. In 2022, he posted eight top-10 finishes and 14 in the top-25 this in his first 22 starts, including a runner-up finish at the Utah Championship.

Suh won the 2022 Korn Ferry Tour Championship and ranked number one in the season-long points race, earning full status for the 2022–23 PGA Tour. He also earned exemption into the 2023 Players Championship and the 2023 U.S. Open, the first year this was on the line at the Korn Ferry Tour Finals. Suh was voted Korn Ferry Tour Player of the Year.

Amateur wins
2013 AJGA Junior at Ruby Hill
2014 Santa Clara County Championship, Northern California Junior
2017 Annual Western Intercollegiate, Trinity Forest Invitational, Saint Mary's Invitational
2018 Amer Ari Invitational, Southern Highlands Collegiate, Pac-12 Championships, Northeast Amateur, Golf Club of Georgia Collegiate
2019 Southwestern Invitational

Source:

Professional wins (1)

Korn Ferry Tour wins (1)

Results in major championships
Results not in chronological order in 2020.

CUT = missed the halfway cut
NT = No tournament due to COVID-19 pandemic

Results in The Players Championship

"T" indicates a tie for a place

U.S. national team appearances
Amateur
 Arnold Palmer Cup: 2018 (winners)
 Eisenhower Trophy: 2018

See also
2022 Korn Ferry Tour Finals graduates

References

External links

American male golfers
USC Trojans men's golfers
PGA Tour golfers
Korn Ferry Tour graduates
Sportspeople from San Jose, California
Sportspeople from Las Vegas
1997 births
Living people